Robert Patrick Minihane (March 9, 1938 – March 30, 2020) was a Canadian football player who played for the Hamilton Tiger-Cats and Montreal Alouettes. He won the Grey Cup with the Tiger-Cats in 1963. He played college football at the Boston University. He died of cancer in 2020.

References

1938 births
Hamilton Tiger-Cats players
2020 deaths